Champaign is the tenth largest city in the U.S. state of Illinois.

Champaign may also refer to:

Places
 Champaign County, Illinois
 Champaign Township, Champaign County, Illinois
 Champaign County, Ohio
 Champaign–Urbana Metropolitan Area

Other uses
 Champaign (band)
 Champaign Central High School
 Champaign-Urbana Courier
 Champaign-Urbana Community Wireless Network
 Champaign-Urbana Mass Transit District
 Champaign ILL, an American comedy series

See also
 Champagne (disambiguation)
 "Shampain", a song by Marina and the Diamonds from The Family Jewels